Chotu gang was a Pakistani gang that engaged in kidnapping, murder and other criminal activities led by Ghulam Rasool who goes by the alias, "Chotu." The gang was based in the Kacha area of Rajanpur.  This gang was involved in many crimes in areas surrounding areas of the Rajanpur. The gang was also known for abducting people from Karachi, Baluchistan and Rahim Yar Khan. Punjab police conducted multiple operations against them, all of them ending in smoke. Punjab police held first operation in 2010, that continued for three months without getting the required results. Punjab police also held an operation in 2013. The gang used light and heavy weapons procured from Afghanistan, including an anti-aircraft gun.

Operation Zarb-e-Ahan
In April, the Pakistan Army launched an operation named Zarb-e-Ahan  against Chotu gang. Resources said that previously four operations launched against Chotu gang were all successful on a small scale. The gangsters had put up a fierce resistance and indiscriminately fired on the law enforcers, killing 7 and kidnapping 18, including the SHO. They also fired mortar rounds to halt any advance of the forces. After the involvement of the army on backup, the police had been successful in killing 54 dacoits., successfully making the gang surrender, which led to the arrest of them and their leader. The police officers who were previously kidnapped, were later released by the gang.

Chotu Gang in the media
Geo Sar Utha Kay is a Pakistani film which is based on Chotu Gang.

Court trial
An anti-terrorism court on March 12, 2019, awarded the death sentence on 18 counts to 20 gangsters, including members of notorious Chotu gang and the ring leader, Ghulam Rasool, for killing six policemen in Rajanpur Kacha area in 2016.

Two other convicts, Qasim and Abdul Samad, who were below the age of 18, were awarded life imprisonment on 19 counts. Other gangs, whose members were awarded death sentences, included Sikhani gang, Inder gang and Changwani gang among others.

The convicts included Ghulam Rasool alias Chotu, his brother Pyara, Nadir, Deen Muhammad, Khalid alias Khaldi, Ishaq alias Bilal, Akram alias Akri, Ghulam Haidar, Hakim, Razzaq, Majid, Nasir, Sher Khan, Jumma alias Bhutta, Rasheed, Behram, Bashir, Abdul  Wahid, Mujeeb-ur-Rahman, and Hussain Bakhsh.

The convicts were awarded death sentence on six counts under Section 302 Pakistan Penal Code, six counts under Section 7 of the Anti-Terrorism Act and another six counts under Section 3 of the Explosive Substance Act 1908.

The convicts were also charged with Rs. 6.2 million fine each or undergo additional imprisonment in case of default. All the 22 convicted would also undergo life imprisonment.

References

Organised crime groups in Pakistan
Police operations in Pakistan